Benthomangelia decapitata is a species of sea snail, a marine gastropod mollusk in the family Mangeliidae.

Description

Distribution
This species occurs in European waters off the British Isles.

References

 Bouchet P. & Warén A. (1980). Revision of the North-East Atlantic bathyal and abyssal Turridae (Mollusca: Gastropoda). Journal of Molluscan Studies Suppl. 8: 1–119 
 Gofas, S.; Le Renard, J.; Bouchet, P. (2001). Mollusca, in: Costello, M.J. et al. (Ed.) (2001). European register of marine species: a check-list of the marine species in Europe and a bibliography of guides to their identification. Collection Patrimoines Naturels, 50: pp. 180–213

External links
 MNHN, Paris : Benthomangelia decapitata

decapitata
Gastropods described in 1980